Commandant Air Cadets is the title given to the Royal Air Force officer who is responsible for running the Royal Air Force Air Cadets, embracing the Air Training Corps (ATC) and the RAF Sections of the Combined Cadet Force (CCF RAF). The current Commandant Air Cadets is Air Commodore Tony Keeling, who assumed the post in September 2020. 

Previously known as Commandant ATC, the appointment is now held by an RAF Air Commodore and is based at Headquarters Air Cadets (HQAC) at RAF Cranwell. Prior to the establishment of HQAC as an independent unit, the post of Commandant ATC was held by the Air Officer Commanding-in-Chief, Reserve, Home and finally Flying Training Command.  HQAC was formed 1 May 1960 within Flying Training Command.

The Commandant is responsible for over 1000 units of the ATC, 199 CCF (RAF) Sections and the nationwide network of Volunteer Gliding Squadrons (VGS).

Until 24 March 2003, the Commandant Air Cadets also held the role of Air Officer Commanding Air Cadets, the appointment then passing to the Air Officer Commanding Training Group (TG). The post has now been merged into the post of AOC TG and no longer exists as a separate entity.

AOC Air Cadets and Commandant ATC 1941 – 2003

Air Officer Commanding Air Cadets 2003 – 2005

Commandant Air Cadets 2003 – present

References

Royal Air Force appointments
Royal Air Force Air Cadets